The Jewish Party was a political party of the First Czechoslovak Republic. It was founded in 1919 by the Jewish National Council in Prague. It was the strongest Jewish political party in the interwar Czechoslovakia although many Jews were rather active in non-Jewish parties, be they Czech, German or Hungarian. The party adopted a Zionist political program and succeeded in influencing the Czechoslovak government to acknowledge Jews as an official national minority in the constitution of 1920.

In an electoral alliance with parties of the Polish minority, it got two candidates elected (Julius Reisz and Ludvík Singer, and from 1931 Angelo Goldstein, after the death of Singer) at the 1929 Czechoslovakian parliamentary elections and again two (Angelo Goldstein and Chaim Kugel) at the 1935 Czechoslovakian parliamentary elections on a common ticket with the Czechoslovak Social Democratic Worker's Party and the Polish Socialist Workers Party.

It was banned in Slovakia after the German occupation of Czechoslovakia on 25 November 1938 and de facto after the end of the Second Czechoslovak Republic on 15 March 1939.

Election results

Footnotes

Bibliography
Lenni Brenner, [https://web.archive.org/web/20120204080142/http://www.marxists.de/middleast/brenner/ch16.htm Zionism in the Age of the Dictators. A Reappraisal. (16. The Jewish Parties of Eastern Europe, Czechoslovakia – 2.4 Per Cent of an Empire)], 1983
Kateřina Čapková, "Židovská Strana", in: YIVO Encyclopaedia, YIVO Institute for Jewish Research, 2010
Marie Crhová, “Jewish Politics in Central Europe: The Case of the Jewish Party in Interwar Czechoslovakia,” Jewish Studies at the Central European University 2 (1999–2001)
 

Interwar minority parties in Czechoslovakia
Jewish political parties
Political parties established in 1921
Zionism in the Czech Republic
Zionist political parties in Europe
Jews and Judaism in Czechoslovakia